Durijan (also Romanized as Dūrījān) is a village in Avarzaman Rural District, Samen District, Malayer County, Hamadan Province, Iran. At the 2006 census, its population was 371, in 82 families.

References 

Populated places in Malayer County